"F. Emasculata" is the twenty-second episode of the second season of the American science fiction television series The X-Files. It was written by series creator Chris Carter and staff writer Howard Gordon, and directed by Rob Bowman. "F. Emasculata" received a Nielsen rating of 8.9 and was watched by 8.5 million households. The episode received mixed reviews from television critics.

The show centers on FBI special agents Fox Mulder (David Duchovny) and Dana Scully (Gillian Anderson) who work on cases linked to the paranormal, called X-Files. Mulder is a believer in the paranormal, while the skeptical Scully has been assigned to debunk his work. In this episode, Scully tries to discover the cause of a mysterious illness after several men in a prison die. Meanwhile, Mulder attempts to find two escapees who could potentially spread the disease.

"F. Emasculata" was based on the actual practice of pharmaceutical companies sending scientists all over the world looking for plants and animals that could have medicinal use. The X-Files director Frank Spotnitz felt that the episode's exploding pustules were ridiculous because of their over-the-top nature. The Costa Rican forest at the opening was shot at the Seymour Demonstration Forest in North Vancouver.

Plot 
In the rain forest of Costa Rica, entomologist Robert Torrance stumbles upon a decomposing boar carcass covered with purple pustules. As he examines one of the pustules, it erupts, spraying him with fluid. By nightfall, he himself has developed the boils and tries to radio for help. When a group of soldiers arrive the next morning, Torrance is dead.

At a prison in Dinwiddie County, Virginia, an inmate also called Robert Torrance receives a package containing a leg of meat. Later, a pustule errupts from the meat and Torrance dies thirty-six hours later. Two other inmates, Paul and Steve are sent to clean Torrance's cell but escape in a laundry cart. Fox Mulder (David Duchovny) and Dana Scully (Gillian Anderson) are sent to help the U.S. Marshals find them. The agents become suspicious as the prison is quarantined by the CDC and the National Guard. Mulder joins the Marshals to hunt the fugitives, while Scully stays behind to investigate the situation in the prison.

Scully learns that the lockdown population is infected with an exceedingly deadly contagion, finding a pile of body bags stored for incineration in the prison's boiler room. Scully cuts open Torrance's body bag and examines his corpse, but Dr. Osbourne, a member of the CDC team, tries to stop her. A pustule on Torrance's body erupts in Osbourne's face, causing him to flee the room. Scully traces Torrance's package to Pinck Pharmaceuticals, a major drug developer. She also finds an insect in the body of another prisoner. Dr. Osbourne, now visibly infected, reveals that his team works for Pinck and is researching a dilating enzyme produced by the insect. However, the insect has a parasitic life cycle that kills its hosts. Osbourne claims that the insect and its contagion were deliberately introduced into the prison by Pinck as an experiment. Osbourne soon dies from the contagion and his body is incinerated in the prison boiler room.

Meanwhile, the fugitives murder a man and steal his campervan, stopping at a gas station. Paul calls his girlfriend, Elizabeth, looking for shelter. The fugitives knock out the gas station clerk and flee in his car, evading the Marshals' raid on the gas station. Mulder sees a CDC biohazard team arrive at the scene, forcibly taking away the clerk in a helicopter. Scully calls Mulder, telling him that the contagion could spread into the population if the fugitives are not captured. The fugitives arrive at Elizabeth's house, where she tends to Steve in the late stages of his infection. As Steve is dying, one of his pustules erupts in Elizabeth's face, infecting her. At that moment, Mulder and the Marshals raid the house and arrest her. However, Paul is still missing.

Mulder confronts Skinner and The Smoking Man, believing that he and Scully were deceived into taking the case without knowing about the contagion. Mulder is adamant that the public should know the truth, but the Smoking Man counters that that would create mass panic and cost more lives. Mulder consults with Scully, but she agrees that exposing Pinck may result in a deadly hysteria.

Questioning the jailed Elizabeth, Mulder finds out that Paul is planning to flee to Toronto by bus. Mulder and the Marshals track down and surround Paul's bus and Mulder tries to talk to Paul, who is the last remaining piece of evidence of the infection. A panicking Paul takes a teenage boy hostage but Mulder persuades him to let the boy go. Before Paul can divulge any information about the infection, he is shot dead by the Marshals.

Later, Mulder confronts Skinner in his office. Mulder is bent on making the affair public, while Skinner warns him that he has no evidence. Scully interjects that Pinck deliberately sent the package to a namesake of the dead entomologist, not only to experiment on prisoners, but so that their involvement could be chalked up to a simple postal error and that the agents' investigation could be discredited. Skinner warns Mulder to be more wary of the situations he will find himself in.

Production 
While F. emasculata and Pinck Pharmaceuticals are fictitious, the show was inspired by the fact that pharmaceutical companies do send researchers the world over looking for unique plants or animals that might prove to have medicinal use. Initially, the show's producers were worried about releasing the episode around the same time as the film Outbreaka movie in which a deadly, contagious disease spreads in a California town. In the end, however, they realized that the two entities were substantially different from one another. Notably, the Smoking Man appears in this episode; his appearance in stand-alone or monster-of-the-week episodes was unusual, as Chris Carter preferred not to mix the show's overarching mythology with its self-contained episodes.

The exploding pustules were carefully rigged to burst on command. Makeup supervisor Toby Lindala created a device that was connected to the fake sores by discreet tubing. When the device was activated, the sores would explode. Filming the scenes with this device was particularly arduous, and Lindala later noted, "[In one scene] I was jammed underneath one of the bus seats with these extras basically stepping on my head." The X-Files director Frank Spotnitz remarked, "When we saw the pustule bursting on film, we just laughed because it was just so over-the-top grotesque." The Lower Seymour Conservation Reserve, North Vancouver stood in for the Costa Rican jungle; this location had previously been used for the season opener "Little Green Men". Both the gas station and the bus station used the same set, which was actually a redecorated car dealership located in Delta, British Columbia.

Reception
"F. Emasculata" was originally broadcast in the United States on the Fox network on April 28, 1995, and was first broadcast in the United Kingdom on BBC One on February 6, 1996. This episode earned a Nielsen rating of 8.9, with a 16 share, meaning that roughly 8.9 percent of all television-equipped households, and 16 percent of households watching television, were tuned in to the episode. It was viewed by 8.5 million households.

The episode received generally mixed reviews from television critics. Entertainment Weekly graded the episode a C, writing, "A good idea is tainted by plot holes as gaping and disturbing as the pustular boils you'll be treated to in this hour". Zack Handlen of The A.V. Club was positive, grading it an A. He particularly praised the way the darkness was handled which made it a "tense, gripping mini-movie", and also praised the guest stars. Robert Shearman and Lars Pearson, in their book Wanting to Believe: A Critical Guide to The X-Files, Millennium & The Lone Gunmen, rated the episode three-and-a-half stars out of five. The two wrote positively of the first part of the entry, noting that it "jogs along quite merrily as a simple contagion story". They were, however, more critical of the second half, noting that the story "takes a left turn and becomes a thoughtful analysis on disinformation, on cover-up, and the public right to truth." Shearman and Pearson called both parts "two really interesting rough drafts", but concluded that the two halves were ill-suited for one another.

Footnotes

Bibliography

External links

"F. Emasculata" on TheXFiles.com
 

1995 American television episodes
Television episodes written by Chris Carter
Costa Rica in fiction
Infectious diseases in fiction
Television episodes about insects
The X-Files (season 2) episodes
Television episodes set in Virginia